General elections were held in the Dominican Republic in 1874. Ignacio María González was elected president.

Results

President

References

Dominican
1874 in the Dominican Republic
Presidential elections in the Dominican Republic
Elections in the Dominican Republic